Fusarium oxysporum f.sp. cyclaminis is a fungal plant pathogen infecting cyclamens.

References

External links
 USDA ARS Fungal Database

oxysporum f.sp. cyclaminis
Fungal plant pathogens and diseases
Ornamental plant pathogens and diseases
Forma specialis taxa
Fungi described in 1954